Walter E. Gaskin Sr. is a retired United States Marine Corps lieutenant general who served as the 19th Deputy Chairman of the NATO Military Committee from May 2009 to August 2013. In that role, he served as Acting Chairman of the NATO Military Committee from November 2011 to January 2012. He was the first African American to be appointed as deputy chairman and chairman of the NATO Military Committee. 

Gaskin currently serves as an Institute for Defense and Business Executive Fellow. In January 2021, North Carolina Governor Roy Cooper named Gaskin the next Secretary of the North Carolina Department of Military and Veterans Affairs.

Marine Corps career
Gaskin served as the Commanding General of the 2d Marine Division at Camp Lejeune, North Carolina, from June 2006 until July 2008. In addition to this role, he simultaneously served as the Commanding General of II Marine Expeditionary Force (Forward). During this tour, Gaskin led II MEF (FWD) during its year-long deployment to Al Anbar Province, Iraq as the Commanding General of Multinational Forces-West.

Previous assignments as a General Officer include service as the Vice Director of The Joint Staff, Washington, D.C. from July 2008 until May 2009 and as the Commanding General of Marine Corps Recruiting Command in Quantico, Virginia, beginning in September 2002. Additionally, he served as the Chief of Staff, Naval Striking and Support Forces-Southern Europe and as the Deputy Commanding General, Fleet Marine Forces-Europe in Naples, Italy from 2002 to 2004. Gaskin's first assignment as a General Officer was the Commanding General, Training and Education Command in Quantico in March 2000.

In addition to his time as Commanding General, Gaskin served four times with the 2d Marine Division (3rd Battalion, 2nd Marine Regiment; 1st Battalion, 2nd Marines; 6th Marine Regiment; and 2nd Battalion, 2nd Marines). During his assignment to 2nd Battalion, 2nd Marines, Gaskin was the Commanding Officer and also served as the Commanding Officer of Battalion Landing Team 2/2 when the battalion was assigned to the 22nd Marine Expeditionary Unit (Special Operations Capable), II MEF for deployment as Landing Force-6th Fleet (LF6F) during Operations Assured Response and Quick Response in defense of American Embassies in Liberia and The Central African Republic.

Gaskin's other previous assignments with II MEF include service as the G-3 Current Operations Action Officer and Operations Officer for II MEF (FWD) supporting Exercise Battle Griffin in Norway; Head of Expeditionary Operations for II MEF G-3; and as Commanding Officer of 22nd MEU (SOC) during deployment as LF6F, participating in Exercises Bright Star 99/00 in Egypt and Infinite Moonlight in Jordan and acting as the Strategic Reserve for operations in Bosnia and Kosovo.

In addition to his service at Camp Lejeune, Gaskin has also served with 3rd Force Service Support Group (Echo and Foxtrot Logistics Support Units); 3rd Marine Division (Division Command Center) in Okinawa, Japan; and with Combined Forces Command C/J-3, Seoul, South Korea as the Head of Ground Forces Branch. Gaskin's supporting establishment service includes assignment as Series Commander and Company Commanding at Marine Corps Recruit Depot, Parris Island, South Carolina; Marine Officer Instructor, Savannah State University NROTC Unit; Assistant Officer Selection Officer, Recruiting Station Macon, Georgia; Action Officer in charge of Unit Environmental Training Programs for Marine Corps Combat Development Center; and Ground Colonels' Monitor at Headquarters Marine Corps. Gaskin retired from the United States Marine Corps on 31 October 2013.

Education
A 1974 graduate from Savannah State University's NROTC Program with a Bachelor of Science, Gaskin also earned a master's degree in Public Administration from the University of Oklahoma in 1992. He has also completed the Senior Executive Seminar from the JFK School of Government, Harvard University, in 2002. His professional military education includes The Basic School and Amphibious Warfare School (1982–83) in Quantico; the United States Army Command and Staff College, Leavenworth, Kansas (1986–1987); the Army War College, Carlisle Barracks, Carlisle, Pennsylvania (1993–1994); and the Combined/Joint Force Land Component Command (C/JFLCC) Course, Carlisle Barracks, Carlisle, Pennsylvania (2009).

Awards and decorations
Lieutenant General Gaskin's personal decorations include:

Post-military career
After retiring from the Marine Corps, Gaskin worked as the Managing Director in Charge of Operation Management Complex of Global Bank in Irvine, California, and then as Chief Executive Officer of La Porte Technology Defense (LAPORTECH).

In January 2021, North Carolina Governor Roy Cooper named Gaskin the next Secretary of the North Carolina Department of Military and Veterans Affairs.
 
In 2016, he endorsed Hillary Clinton for president.

Notes

References

External links

 NATO Deputy Chairman, Military Committee , March, 2010.
 NATO Deputy Chairman, Military Committee in Kyiv Ukraine , Feb 11, 2011

Year of birth missing (living people)
Living people
Recipients of the Legion of Merit
United States Marine Corps generals
United States Marine Corps officers
Savannah State University alumni
Harvard Kennedy School alumni
United States Army Command and General Staff College alumni
Recipients of the Defense Superior Service Medal
Recipients of the Humanitarian Service Medal
State cabinet secretaries of North Carolina
Military personnel from North Carolina
African-American state cabinet secretaries
African-American people in North Carolina politics